Pramod Thomas is an Indian audio engineer and sound designer from Pandalam, Kerala. He is best known for his work on Hindi and Malayalam films such as Anurag Kashyap's Dev.D (2009) and Shankar's Enthiran (2010). After graduating from the Film and Television Institute of India, Pune, he started his career in sound simultaneously in the Malayalam, Hindi and Tamil film industry since his debut in the late 1990s. 

He has worked as sound engineer and/or sound designer for films across the country including Rituparno Ghosh's Raincoat (2004). He proved his commitment and sound perspective in Tamil and Malayalam films Other films include Veettilekkulla Vazhi (2011), Kismath (2018), Kaadu Pookkunna Neram (2016), Rakshadhikari Baiju Oppu (2017) and Eeda (2018).

Recognition 
Pramod Thomas won the Kerala State Film Award for Best Sound Design.

Filmography

References

External links

Kerala State Film Awards - Full List of Winners

1960 births
Living people
Film musicians from Kerala
Film and Television Institute of India alumni
People from Pathanamthitta district
Indian sound designers
21st-century Indian composers